The James Arthur Morrison House, also known as the Morrison-Walker House, is a historic Spanish Colonial Revival style house and garage/guest house in Mobile, Alabama, United States.  The two-story stucco and concrete main house was completed in 1926.  It features Mission-style side parapets on the main block, red tile roofing, a central entrance courtyard with a decorative gate, a rear arcaded porch, and arched doorways on the exterior and in the interior.  The matching garage/guest house has a two-story central block with a massive chimney and is flanked to each side by one-story garage door bays.  The house and garage were added to the National Register of Historic Places as a part of the Spanish Revival Residences in Mobile Multiple Property Submission on July 12, 1991.

References

National Register of Historic Places in Mobile, Alabama
Houses on the National Register of Historic Places in Alabama
Houses in Mobile, Alabama
Houses completed in 1926
Spanish Colonial Revival architecture in Alabama